The 45th Primetime Emmy Awards were held on Sunday, September 19, 1993. The ceremony was broadcast on ABC and was hosted by Angela Lansbury. MTV received its first major nomination at this ceremony.

For its fourth season, Seinfeld won its first, and only, Primetime Emmy Award for Outstanding Comedy Series. Cheers was once again nominated for Outstanding Comedy Series. It was nominated for all eleven years that it ran and won four times. This tied the record set by M*A*S*H which also went 11/11, but only won once.

On the drama side, Northern Exposure was the defending champion and was seen heavily as the favorite coming into the ceremony being the most nominated show with 11 major nominations—but in a major upset, Picket Fences took home Outstanding Drama Series. Northern Exposure set the dubious record for the largest shutout of all time, as it lost all 11 major nominations; including its Creative Arts Emmy Awards nominations, the record increases to 0/16. This record would later be tied by The Larry Sanders Show in 1997, but both of these records were later broken by Mad Men (0/17) in 2012, and again by The Handmaid's Tale (0/21) in 2021.

With David Clennon's win for Outstanding Comedy Guest Actor, this was the first time HBO won an Acting Emmy.

Winners and nominees

Programs

Acting

Lead performances

Supporting performances

Guest performances

Directing

Writing

Most major nominations
By network 
 NBC – 45
 CBS – 36
 HBO – 35
 ABC – 20

By program
 Northern Exposure (CBS) – 11
 Seinfeld (NBC) – 9
 The Larry Sanders Show (HBO) – 8
 Cheers (NBC) – 7
 Barbarians at the Gate (HBO) / I'll Fly Away (NBC) / Picket Fences (CBS) – 6

Most major awards
By network 
 NBC – 10
 HBO – 7
 CBS – 5
 ABC – 4
 Fox / PBS – 2

By program
 Picket Fences (CBS) / The Positively True Adventures of the Alleged Texas Cheerleader-Murdering Mom (HBO) / Seinfeld (NBC) – 3
 Dream On (HBO) / Homicide: Life on the Street (NBC) / Roseanne (ABC) – 2

Notes

References

External links
 Emmys.com list of 1993 Nominees & Winners
 

045
1993 television awards
1993 in California
September 1993 events in the United States
Events in Pasadena, California
20th century in Pasadena, California